Ralph Augustus Benson  (15 October 1828 — 11 March 1886) was an English first-class cricketer and barrister.

The only son of Moses George Benson, he was born in October 1828 at Hanley, Worcestershire. He was educated at Winchester College, before going up to Christ Church, Oxford. 

A member of the Inner Temple, he was called to the bar in January 1854. Benson played first-class cricket for the Marylebone Cricket Club (MCC) in 1855, against Oxford University at Oxford. Batting once in the match, he was run out for 2 runs in the MCC first innings. In addition to playing first-class cricket, Benson also played minor matches for Shropshire. He held the roles of recorder of Shrewsbury from 1866 to 1879 and was a Metropolitan Police magistrate at Southwark Crown Court from 1867 to 1879. He was additionally a justice of the peace for Shropshire and the Liberty of the Tower. Benson was a member of the Carlton Club. 

He died at his Montagu Square residence following a prolonged illness in March 1886. He was married to Selina Henrietta Cockerell, daughter of the cricketer Louis Cockerell. His granddaughter was the novelist and travel writer Stella Benson.

References

External links

1828 births
1886 deaths
People from Malvern Hills District
People educated at Winchester College
Alumni of Christ Church, Oxford
Members of the Inner Temple
English barristers
English cricketers
Marylebone Cricket Club cricketers
English justices of the peace
Stipendiary magistrates (England and Wales)